State Road 55 (SR 55) is a north–south road in Northern and Central Indiana.

Route description
SR 55 southern terminus is at an intersection with State Road 25 (SR 25).  SR 55 heads northwest towards Newtown where SR 55 has an intersection with State Road 341.  SR 55 heads northwest out of Newtown towards U.S. Route 41 (US 41).  SR 55 and US 41 are concurrent for  through Attica.  Northwest of Attica SR 55 leaves US 41 and heads north Oxford.  North of Oxford, SR 55 has an intersection with U.S. Route 52 (US 52).  US 52 and SR 55 are concurrent for  until Fowler.  In Fowler SR 55 leaves US 52 heading north towards Goodland.  In Goodland SR 55 is concurrent with U.S. Route 24 (US 24).  SR 55 heads north towards Crown Point passing through intersection with State Road 16, State Road 114, State Road 14, State Road 10, and State Road 2.  In Crown Point SR 55 has an intersection with U.S. Route 231.  SR 55 heads north after US 231 towards an intersection with Business US 6, the northern terminus of SR 55 is at this point.
Lake County has other names for Indiana 55. In Gary, it is called Cleveland Street. In Merrillville, it is Taft Street. In Crown Point, it is Main Street.

History 
Between 1917 and 1926 SR 55 had a different route that follows the route that SR 2 takes today, from Hebron and Valparaiso.  At this point the route that SR 55 takes today was of Old SR 8.
In 1930, SR 55 and State Road 53 swapped routes in Lake County.
At some point, the southern terminus of SR 55 was at the intersection with U.S. Route 136, approximately two miles west of Crawfordsville.

Major intersections

References

External links 

055
Transportation in Gary, Indiana
Northwest Indiana
Transportation in Benton County, Indiana
Transportation in Montgomery County, Indiana
Transportation in Fountain County, Indiana
Transportation in Warren County, Indiana
Transportation in Newton County, Indiana
Transportation in Lake County, Indiana